Napoleon and Josephine: A Love Story is an American television miniseries broadcast on ABC from November 10 to 12, 1987.  It stars Armand Assante as Napoleon Bonaparte and Jacqueline Bisset as Joséphine de Beauharnais, with Stephanie Beacham as Therese Tallien, Patrick Cassidy as Hippolyte Charles, Jane Lapotaire as Letizia Bonaparte, Anthony Perkins as Talleyrand, and Ione Skye as Pauline Bonaparte. It was directed by Richard T. Heffron, based on a screenplay by James Lee.

The plot focuses on the romantic relationship between Napoleon and Josephine from 1794 to 1814, only lightly touching on battles and other historical events. Executive producer David L. Wolper, who had previously created prominent miniseries such as North and South (directed by Heffron) and Roots (written by Lee, among others), stated, "The mini-series covers some of Napoleon's military accomplishments, but only as a backdrop to how the love between these two people affected France, the world and, most importantly, Napoleon and Josephine themselves."

Cast

Filming
Napoleon and Josephine was filmed on location in Paris and Morocco, and at studios in Portsmouth. The producers decided to shoot scenes in Paris rather than less expensive locales out of a desire for authenticity. This, and a scheduling disruption when star Bisset missed four days of filming due to illness, caused the budget to grow to $20 million.

Reception
Critical reaction to Napoleon and Josephine was largely negative. Jeff Jarvis of People described the production as a "gooey mess". John J. O'Connor of the New York Times was unimpressed with the leads' performances:

Howard Rosenberg of the Los Angeles Times found Bisset "credible as a sympathetic Josephine" and praised the series' "nice battle sequences", but criticized the script as "heavy on hot-breathed romance, though – offering little sense of history or Napoleon's genius."

Nielsen ratings for the series were disappointing, with its three episodes finishing 15th, 26th, and 30th in their respective time slots.

Napoleon and Josephine received two Emmy nominations – Gerald Fried for Outstanding Achievement in Music Composition, and Michel Fresnay for Outstanding Achievement in Costuming.

References

External links
 

Love stories
1980s American television miniseries
1987 American television series debuts
1987 American television series endings
American Broadcasting Company original programming
Television series by The Wolper Organization
Television shows set in France
Television series set in the 1790s
Television series set in the 1800s
Television series set in the 1810s